John Theophilus Gilday (1874 – 29 August 1937) was a meatworker and member of the Queensland Legislative Assembly.

Biography
Gilday was born in Ballarat, Victoria, to parents Martin Gilday and his wife Honorah (née Corcoran). He went to Ballarat State School and became a meatworker in New South Wales. He was a director of the Daily Standard & The Worker newspapers.

On 1 February 1899 he married Mary Walker (died 1953) in Brisbane and together had two sons and two daughters. He died in August 1937 and his funeral proceeded from his late residence in Paddington to the Toowong Cemetery.

Public career
Gilday, for the Labor Party, held the seat of Ithaca in the Queensland Legislative Assembly from its inception in 1912 until his retirement from politics in 1926.

References

Members of the Queensland Legislative Assembly
1874 births
1937 deaths
Burials at Toowong Cemetery
Australian Labor Party members of the Parliament of Queensland